Pakpattan District (Urdu and ), is a district of Punjab province in Pakistan, Pakpattan is the district capital. According to the 1998 census of Pakistan, it had a population of 1,286,680 of which 14% were urban. It has since risen to 1,563,000.

Administrative division
The district is divided into two tehsils, which contain a total of 63 Union Councils:

Pakpattan is the city of the great Saint Baba Farid of Chisti. The original name of Pakpattan was "Ajodhan". It was renamed Pakpattan after it was used for the first time by Baba Fariduddin Ganj Shakar. The word Pakpattan consists of two words "pak" and "pattan" meaning "clean dockland" (Pattan means a dockland or place where ships or boats stop). The city was given this name by Saint Baba Farid. It is said, once Saint Farid having ablution on the bank of the River Sutlej. One local man told the Saint that this water is unclean and place is dirty then Saint Farid replied to him "no its clean water and place' in the local language "Pak Pattan'. However, King Akbar declared the Name Pakpattan.

Location
The capital Pakpattan is located about 169 km from Lahore and 205 km from Multan. The district is bounded to the northwest by Sahiwal District, to the north by Okara District, to the southeast by the Sutlej River and Bahawalnagar District, and to the southwest by Vehari District.

Education
Pakpattan Average Literacy Rate is 60.7%. District Pakpattan has a variety of quality schools and colleges. People are becoming zealous for quality education every day.

History
Pakpattan District was agricultural region with forests during the Indus Valley civilization. The Vedic period is characterized by Indo-Aryan culture that invaded from Central Asia and settled in Punjab region. The Kambojas, Daradas, Kaikayas, Madras, Pauravas, Yaudheyas, Malavas and Kurus invaded, settled and ruled ancient Punjab region. After overrunning the Achaemenid Empire in 331 BCE, Alexander marched into present-day Punjab region with an army of 50,000. The Pakpattan was ruled by Maurya Empire, Indo-Greek kingdom, Kushan Empire, Gupta Empire, White Huns, Kushano-Hephthalites and the Turk and Hindu Shahi kingdoms.

In 997 CE, Sultan Mahmud Ghaznavi, took over the Ghaznavid dynasty empire established by his father, Sultan Sebuktegin, In 1005 A.D. he conquered the Shahis in Kabul in 1005, and followed it by the conquests of Punjab region. The Delhi Sultanate and later Mughal Empire ruled the region. The Punjab region became predominantly Muslim due to missionary Sufi saints whose dargahs dot the landscape of Punjab region.

After the decline of the Mughal Empire, the Sikh conquered Pakpattan District. During the period of British rule, Pakpattan district increased in population and importance.

The predominantly Muslim population supported Muslim League and Pakistan Movement.  After the independence of Pakistan in 1947, the minority Hindus and Sikhs migrated to India while the Muslim refugees from India settled in the Pakpattan District. The main reason of the fame of this city is due to Hazzrat Baba Farid (Rehmullah). Basically he is the man who renamed Ajodhan Pakpattan. Before his arrival to Pakpattan, there were at least 30,000 Hindus and Sikhs in Pakpattan. He came to Pakpattan on the orders of his Murshad Qutbuddin Bakhtiar Kaki for preaching of Islam.

On 6 July 1910, First Rail Link was established of Pakpattan. 345.7 km (213.4 mi) long Lodhran - Kasur section was opened. This section was later dismantled during World War I, reconstructed and opened again between 1923 and 1924. On 15 April 2002 a new Karachi to Lahore express via Pakpattan was introduced. The name of the train is Fareed Express.

Demographics
At the time of the 2017 census the district had a population of 1,824,228, of which 928,110 were males and 895,899 females. Rural population is 1,535,236 while the urban population is 288,992. The literacy rate was 52.70%. Muslims made up almost the entire population with 99.68%.

At the time of the 2017 census, 96.94% of the population spoke Punjabi and 2.53% Urdu as their first language.

According to the 1998 census, the predominant first language is Punjabi, spoken by 95.9% of the population, followed by Urdu with 3.7%. Haryanvi, also called Rangari, is spoken among Ranghar, Rajput, while the Meo Rajputs have their own language which is called Mewati

Agriculture
The Pakpattan District is known for the fertility of its soil and most of the population of Pakpattan district makes a living on agriculture. The main crops are wheat, rice, cotton, maize (corn), sugar cane, etc. The primary fruits and vegetables that are harvested are mango, guava, carrots, potatoes, oranges and okra.

Malka Hans 
Malka Hans is the ancient famous town near Pakpattan in Pakpattan District located between Pakpattan and Sahiwal on Sahiwal Road.
It is famous for being the place of origin of Heer Ranjha, written by poet Waris Shah.

See also

Pakpattan Canal
Chak Shafi

References

External links
 Pakpattan District website

 
Districts of Punjab, Pakistan